Liuzhangli station (formerly transliterated as Liuchang Li Station until 2003) is a station on the Brown Line of the Taipei Rapid Transit System, located on the border of Taipei, Taiwan.

Station overview

The three-level, elevated station has two side platforms, and has one exit. It is located at the intersection of Heping East Rd. and Keelung Rd.

Station layout

Exits
Single Exit: Intersection of Heping E. Rd. and Keelung Rd.

Around the station
 Ministry of Justice Taipei City Investigations Office
 Liuzhangli Market
 Martial Law Era Victims Memorial Park
 Far Eastern Business Center
 Jianan Elementary School
 George Vocational High School of Taipei
 Taiwan Mobile Building
 Chung-Hua Institution for Economic Research
 The Mall

References

Railway stations opened in 1996
Wenhu line stations